This is the discography of American singer Nikka Costa.

Albums

Studio albums

Promotional albums

Video albums

EPs

Singles

References

Discographies of American artists
Pop music discographies